Caribou Wind Park is a large wind farm project located approximately 70 km west of Bathurst, New Brunswick which was completed in November 2009. The farm is the second in New Brunswick. It is owned and operated by GDF Suez and the power is purchased by NB Power for supply to consumers.

The farm consists of thirty-three 3 megawatt (MW) wind turbines for a total capacity of 99 MW.

The project's 'phase one' is now completed with a 'phase two' planned at an undetermined date in the future to add more turbines increasing the total output to 200 MW.

See also

List of wind farms in Canada

References

Wind farms in New Brunswick